Dieguinho may refer to:

Dieguinho (futsal player) (born 1989), Brazilian futsal player
Dieguinho (footballer, born 1989), Brazilian footballer
Dieguinho (footballer, born 1992), Brazilian footballer
Jackson Diego Ibraim Fagundes (born 1995), sometimes known as Dieguinho, Brazilian footballer